"Good to My Baby" is a song composed by Brian Wilson with words by Mike Love for the American rock band The Beach Boys.

Composition

Author Philip Lambert wrote that the song "has all the earmarks of a classic feel-good Beach Boys song: powerful, catchy vocals, including back-and-forth leads between Brian and Mike [Love], a clean, tight instrumental track, and a straightforward message about the rewards and benefits of monogamy." Scott Interrante of PopMatters claimed that the song was "a solidly written song reminiscent of the group's earlier singles: sophisticated but digestible and fun" and went on to claim that "when it’s juxtaposed against songs like 'When I Grow Up (To Be a Man)' and 'Please Let Me Wonder', it shows us just how impressive those other songs really are."

Other appearances

Aside from its appearance on Today!, "Good to My Baby" has since been released on numerous compilation albums. The song appeared on the British release of Best of The Beach Boys Vol. 2, as well as 1975's Spirit of America, the follow-up to the band's hugely successful 1974 compilation album, Endless Summer. More recently, the song has appeared on albums such as the box set The Capitol Years, the compilation album Summer Love Songs, and the rarities collection Hawthorne, CA.

Personnel
As documented by Craig Slowinski.
The Beach Boys
Al Jardine – backing vocals
Mike Love – lead & backing vocals
Brian Wilson – grand piano, lead & backing vocals
Carl Wilson – lead and rhythm guitar, backing vocals
Dennis Wilson – backing vocals
Additional musicians and production staff

References

1965 songs
The Beach Boys songs
Songs written by Brian Wilson
Songs written by Mike Love
Song recordings produced by Brian Wilson